Lise St-Denis (born April 18, 1940) is a Canadian former politician. She was elected to the House of Commons of Canada in the 2011 election and served a single term. She was elected in the electoral district of Saint-Maurice—Champlain as a member of the New Democratic Party, but crossed the floor to the Liberal Party of Canada on January 10, 2012, saying in French to explain her move: "Voters voted for Jack Layton. Jack Layton is dead."

Prior to being elected, St-Denis was a teacher. She has bachelor's and master's degrees in Quebec literature and education. She previously ran as the New Democratic Party's candidate in Longueuil—Pierre-Boucher in the 2008 election, losing to Jean Dorion of the Bloc Québécois.

Shortly after her election, St-Denis was diagnosed with non-Hodgkin's lymphoma. St-Denis did not stand for re-election in 2015.

Before joining the Liberals, St-Denis supported Thomas Mulcair to be the next leader of the NDP.

Electoral history

Saint-Maurice—Champlain

Longueuil—Pierre-Boucher

References

External links

1940 births
Women members of the House of Commons of Canada
Living people
Members of the House of Commons of Canada from Quebec
Liberal Party of Canada MPs
New Democratic Party MPs
Politicians from Montreal
21st-century Canadian politicians
21st-century Canadian women politicians